Vincent Jeanne (born 31 May 1991 in Harfleur) is a former male French short track speed skater. He was third in the overall competition at the 2016 European Championships in Sochi, though he did not finish in top-3 in any event at those championships. He was also bronze medalist in the relay competition at the 2011 Winter Universiade in Erzurum.

He participated only once at the World Championships. His best personal result was 27th in 1500 m event at the 2016 World Championships in Seoul. His best World Cup finish was 8th in the 1500 m at the World Cup stage in Erzurum during the 2014-15 season.

He was last active in the 2017/18 season. During his sporting career, he represented Club de Vitesse sur Glace du Havre from Le Havre.

External links
 Athlete's statistics
 Person Bio

1991 births
Living people
French male short track speed skaters
Universiade medalists in short track speed skating
Medalists at the 2011 Winter Universiade
21st-century French people
Universiade bronze medalists for France